The Council of Churches in Namibia (CCN) is an ecumenical organisation in Namibia. Its member churches together represent 1.5 million people, 90% of the population of Namibia. It is a member of the Fellowship of Christian Councils in Southern Africa.

CCN has its roots in the Christian Centre, which established in 1975 "as an ecumenical meeting place for black workers in Windhoek." Its purpose was to "speak with a united voice against injustice on behalf of the voiceless; and to initiate relief projects for the poor," but its real goal was to establish the Council of Churches in Namibia, which happened in 1978. Prior to Namibian independence, the CCN spoke out against repression and racism in the apartheid regime, and was "particularly outspoken in its denunciation in South Africa's introduction of conscription for all young men in Namibia." 

Since independence, the Council of Churches in Namibia has been involved in humanitarian activities such as helping political prisoners and addressing the issues of hunger and drought. CCN is an umbrella organisation, with all its member churches being autonomous and independent. It views itself as a "facilitating body" to create a "platform for dialogue on different issues."

Membership
There were five founding members:
 African Methodist Episcopal Church (AME)
 Anglican Diocese of Namibia
 Evangelical Lutheran Church in Namibia (ELCIN)
 Methodist Church of Southern Africa (MCSA)
 Roman Catholic Church

Eight denominations have since joined the CCN: 
 Dutch Reformed Church in Namibia
 Evangelical Lutheran Church in the Republic of Namibia
 German-speaking Evangelical Lutheran Church in Namibia (GELK)
 Protestant Unity Church
 Rhenish Church in Namibia
 United Congregational Church of Southern Africa
 United Methodist Church in Namibia
 Uniting Reformed Church in Southern Africa 

The Coptic Orthodox Church is an associate member, while the Reformed Churches in South Africa, the Apostolic Faith Mission of Namibia, the Pentecostal Protestant Church, the Ecumenical Institute of Namibia, and the Young Women's Christian Association are observer members.

References

Churches in Namibia
Namibia
Christian organizations established in 1978
1978 establishments in South West Africa
Christian organizations based in Africa